In mathematics, especially topology, a perfect map is a particular kind of continuous function between topological spaces. Perfect maps are weaker than homeomorphisms, but strong enough to preserve some topological properties such as local compactness that are not always preserved by continuous maps.

Formal definition 
Then  is known as a perfect map.

Examples and properties 
(If  is merely continuous, then even if  is regular,  need not be regular.
 If  is a perfect map and if  is locally compact, then  is locally compact.
 If  is a perfect map and if  is second countable, then  is second countable.
 Every injective perfect map is a homeomorphism. This follows from the fact that a bijective closed map has a continuous inverse.
 If  is a perfect map and if  is connected, then  need not be connected. For example, the constant map from a compact disconnected space to a singleton space is a perfect map.
 A perfect map need not be open. Indeed, consider the map  given by  if  and  if . This map is closed, continuous (by the pasting lemma), and surjective and therefore is a perfect map (the other condition is trivially satisfied). Note that this map is a quotient map and the quotient operation is 'gluing' two intervals together.
 Notice how, to preserve properties such as local connectedness, second countability, local compactness etc. ... the map must be not only continuous but also open. A perfect map need not be open (see previous example), but these properties are still preserved under perfect maps.
 Every homeomorphism is a perfect map. This follows from the fact that a bijective open map is closed and that since a homeomorphism is injective, the inverse of each element of the range must be finite in the domain (in fact, the inverse must have precisely one element).
 Every perfect map is a quotient map. This follows from the fact that a closed, continuous surjective map is always a quotient map.
 Let G be a compact topological group which acts continuously on X. Then the quotient map from X to X/G is a perfect map.
 Perfect maps are proper. The converse is true, provided the topology of Y is Hausdorff and compactly generated.

See also

References 

 

Theory of continuous functions